European route E 852 is a European B class road in North Macedonia and Albania, connecting the city Ohrid – border Albania.

Route 
 
  Ohrid - Struga - / border crossing
 border Albania
 SH3 Librazhd-Elbasan-Tirane (Tentative)

Notes 
Road signs on the A3 motorway (Tirane-Elbasan) include E852 in both directions.

External links 
 UN Economic Commission for Europe: Overall Map of E-road Network (2007)
 International E-road network

International E-road network
Roads in North Macedonia
European routes in Albania